Upper Halliford railway station is immediately north of the border of Upper Halliford in Sunbury-on-Thames, Surrey, England.

The station and all trains serving it are operated by South Western Railway.

History
Upper Halliford Halt was opened on 1 May 1944 by Southern for the Windmill Road industrial zone which then had a wartime factory of the British Thermostat Company, manufacturing parts for the bombing of Germany. The second platform was opened on 6 May 1946.

The platforms are linked by a devoted footbridge. The station building is only used for maintenance so a ticket machine instead stands.

Platform 2 (the down platform, with services towards Shepperton) is being rebuilt, with work due to finish in November 2021.

Footpaths/access
SW: immediately, to the flat, residential end of Upper Halliford Road.
SE: two clambering/sloped paths to the west pavement of bridge of Upper Halliford Road (over motorway and railway).
E: under the southern bridge's ramp, to the north side of Nursery Road.

Services 

The weekday off-peak service from the station is:

 2 trains per hour to London Waterloo via Kingston, Wimbledon and Clapham Junction
 2 trains per hour to Shepperton.

From Monday to Saturday, four additional early morning rush-hour trains to Waterloo are routed via Twickenham and Richmond. Three additional evening rush-hour trains from Waterloo arrive via that route.

On Sundays services, hourly only, start later and finish earlier than other days.

References

External links

Railway stations in Surrey
Former Southern Railway (UK) stations
Railway stations in Great Britain opened in 1944
Railway stations served by South Western Railway
Borough of Spelthorne